Dowland is a crater on Mercury. It has a diameter of 158 kilometers. Its name was adopted by the International Astronomical Union in 1979, and refers to the English composer John Dowland, who lived from 1562 to 1626.

References

Impact craters on Mercury